Andrew Berry (born March 30, 1987) is an American football executive who is the current general manager and executive vice president of football operations for the Cleveland Browns of the National Football League (NFL). He previously served various other scouting roles with the Indianapolis Colts and Philadelphia Eagles.

Early life
At Harvard, Berry graduated with a bachelor's degree in economics and a master's degree in computer science. He also played football for the Harvard Crimson.

April 29, 2021 Andrew Berry and his wife had their first  daughter Eden Ruth Berry; they have two older sons, Zion and Kairo.

Executive career

Indianapolis Colts
In 2009, Berry was hired as an assistant scout for the Indianapolis Colts. Over the next six years, he would serve as their pro scouting coordinator.

Cleveland Browns
In 2016, Berry was hired to be the vice president of player personnel for the Cleveland Browns.

Philadelphia Eagles
In 2019, Berry was hired by the Philadelphia Eagles as their vice president of football operations following a tumultuous tenure with the Browns and the firing of Sashi Brown toward the end of the 2017 season.

Cleveland Browns (second stint)
On January 27, 2020, Berry returned to the Cleveland Browns and was hired to be their general manager and executive vice president of football operations. The move made him the youngest GM in NFL history at the time at age 32.

References

External links
 Cleveland Browns profile

Living people
National Football League executives
Harvard College alumni
1987 births
Indianapolis Colts scouts
Cleveland Browns executives
Philadelphia Eagles executives
National Football League general managers
Harvard Crimson football players